This is a list of radio stations broadcast in Spain.

National public radio service

RNE is Spain's national public radio broadcaster and operates six stations:
Radio Nacional - General service of mostly speech-based programming
Radio Clásica - Classical music and concerts
Radio 3 - Music outside the mainstream scene
Ràdio 4 - Regional service broadcasting in the Catalan language
Radio 5 (Todo Noticias) - 24-hour news channel
Radio Exterior de España - International, external broadcasting service

National commercial networks
The following groups operate commercial radio networks broadcasting across Spain:

PRISA Radio
Cadena SER - Generalist radio station featuring mostly news, talk and sports.
Los 40 - Contemporary hit radio station. Comparable to Capital or BBC Radio 1.
Cadena Dial - Spanish adult-contemporary radio station.
Los 40 Classic - Oldies music station dedicated to the hits from mostly the 1980s and '90s.
Los 40 Dance - Electronic dance music station dedicated to a wide variety of its sub-genres.
Los 40 Urban - Urban contemporary music station dedicated to reggaeton and trap music.
Radiolé - Music station dedicated to copla, rumba, flamenco and sevillanas.

Radio Popular
Cadena COPE - Generalist radio station featuring mostly news, talk and sports with a religious appeal.
Cadena 100 - Adult-contemporary radio station. Comparable to Heart or BBC Radio 2.
MegaStar FM - Youth-focused hybrid pop/dance music station that includes limited recurrent rotation. 
Rock FM - Classic rock music station.

Atresmedia Radio
Onda Cero - Generalist radio station featuring news, talk and sports.
Europa FM - Contemporary hit radio station dedicated to pop-rock hits since the 2000s.
Melodía FM - Oldies music station dedicated to the hits from the 1970s, '80s and '90s.

Kiss Media
Kiss FM - Oldies music station dedicated to the hits mostly from the 1980s and '90s, sometimes from the 1970s and 2000s, and sporadically from today.
Hit FM - Youth-focused mostly-current international contemporary hit radio station.

Unidad Editorial
Radio Marca - Sports radio station. Comparable to ESPN Deportes Radio.

Libertad Digital
esRadio

Intereconomía Corporación
Radio Inter
Radio Intereconomía

Current FM band in Madrid
This is a list of radio stations in Madrid, Spain. There are 38 radio stations in Madrid.
87.6: Onda Latina
87.9: Espy FM
88.2: RNE Radio Nacional
88.6: M21 Radio
89.0: Los 40 Classic
89.3: Pepe Radio
90.3: RNE Radio 5
91.0: Europa FM
91.7: Cadena Dial
92.4: Radiolé
92.9: Radio Internacional
93.2: RNE Radio 3
93.9: Los 40 
94.2: Radio 4G
94.8: Gestiona Radio
95.1: Radio Intereconomía
96.5: RNE Radio Clásica
96.9: Radio Maria
97.2: Top Radio
98.0: Onda Cero
99.1: esRadio
99.5: Cadena 100
99.8: Radio Sol XXI
100.7: MegaStar FM
101.3: Onda Madrid
101.7: Rock FM
102.1: Radio Corazón Tropical
102.4: Factory FM
102.7: Kiss FM
103.2: Capital Radio
103.5: Radio Marca
104.3: Los 40 Dance
105.1: Super Q FM
105.4: Cadena SER
106.3: Cadena COPE
107.2: Fiesta FM
107.5: Radio Vallekas
108.4: BigGay Radio

English-language radio stations

CANARY ISLANDS

Other foreign-language radio stations

German

Dutch

Catalan

Russian

Scandinavian

Spanish

Indie fm online 
https://indiefmonline.es
Barcelona

See also
 Media of Spain
 Internet in Spain
 Television in Spain
 Newspapers in Spain

References

External links
esradios.com Listen all FM radio stations in Spain
Radiomap.eu/es/ Radio stations in Spain
FMLIST worldwide database of FM stations
FMSCAN worldwide FM reception prediction
MWLIST worldwide database of MW and LW stations
Wikionlineradio.com Streaming radio in Spain
MWSCAN worldwide MW and SW reception prediction

 
Radio stations
Spain